Melionyx is a genus of bird in the family Meliphagidae.

These species were formerly placed in the genus Melidectes. They were moved to the resurrected genus Melionyx  based on the results of a molecular phylogenetic study published in 2019. At the same time the common names were changed from "melidectes" to "honeyeater".

The genus contains three species:

 Sooty honeyeater (Melionyx fuscus)
 Short-bearded honeyeater (Melionyx nouhuysi)
 Long-bearded honeyeater (Melionyx princeps)

References

 
Bird genera
Taxa named by Tom Iredale